State Road 51 (NM 51) is a state highway in the US state of New Mexico. NM 51's western terminus is at Interstate 25 Business (I-25 Bus.) in Truth or Consequences, and the  eastern terminus is a continuation as County Road A013 in Engle.

Major intersections

See also

 List of state roads in New Mexico

References

External links

051
Transportation in Sierra County, New Mexico